Margaretta Armstrong Finch-Hatton, Countess of Winchilsea and Nottingham (née Drexel) (March 1, 1885 – December 22, 1952) was an American heiress who married into the English aristocracy.

Early life
Margaretta was born in 1885 into a wealthy Philadelphia banking dynasty. She was the daughter of Margarita (née Armstrong) Drexel and Anthony Joseph Drexel Jr. Her brothers Anthony Joseph Drexel III and John Armstrong Drexel were also bankers (John was a partner in the securities firm of William P. Bonbright & Co. of London and New York along with her husband). In 1917, her parents divorced and, the following year, her mother married Brinsley FitzGerald (the son of Peter FitzGerald, 1st Baronet of Valencia) in 1918.

Her paternal grandparents were Anthony Joseph Drexel and Ellen (née Rozet) Drexel and her maternal grandfather was John Armstrong of the Baltimore Armstrongs.

Margaretta was presented at court in 1908 by Princess Louise Margaret of Prussia, the Duchess of Connaught. Reportedly, after her presentation at court, she "at once attained great popularity in London society. Her modesty and simple, easy manners, attracted everyone. Among her reported suitors were Prince Christopher, sixth son of King George of Greece; Prince Francis of Teck; and Prince Francis Joseph, second son of the Duke and Duchess of Braganza, whose eldest son Prince Miguel, had married her cousin, Miss Anita Stewart."

Personal life
On 8 June 1910, Margaretta was married to Guy Finch-Hatton, Viscount Maidstone by the Bishop of London at St Margaret's, Westminster by the Bishop of London. The reception was held at the Drexel home in Grosvenor Square. He was the son of Henry Finch-Hatton and the former Anne Jane Codrington. His two siblings were Gladys Margaret Finch-Hatton (who married Capt. Osmond Williams, a son of Sir Osmond Williams, 1st Baronet) and Denys Finch Hatton, a noted big-game hunter. Together, Guy and Margaretta were the parents of three children:

 Christopher Finch-Hatton, 15th Earl of Winchilsea (1911–1950), who married Countess Gladys Széchényi Sárvár-Felsövidék, daughter of Count László Széchényi Sárvár-Felsövidék, of the Polish noble Széchényi family, and Gladys Vanderbilt Széchenyi, a member of the American Vanderbilt family. They divorced in 1945 and he married Agnes Mary Conroy in 1946.
 Lady Daphne Margarita Finch-Hatton (1913–2003), who married Whitney Straight (1912–1979), a member of the Whitney family, in 1935.
 Lady Henrietta Diana Juanita Finch-Hatton (1917–1977), who married Peter Frank Tiarks (1910–1975).

In 1927, upon the death of his father, her husband became the 14th Earl of Winchilsea and 9th Earl of Nottingham, and Margaretta became known as the Countess of Winchilsea and Nottingham.

Lord Winchilsea died in London on 10 February 1939, and was buried at Ewerby in Lincolnshire. In September 1939, Lady Winchilsea survived the sinking of the S.S. Athenia, which was torpedoed by a German U-boat.  Lady Winchilsea died in London in 1952.

References

External links

 Margaretta Armstrong Finch-Hatton (née Drexel), Countess of Winchilsea and Nottingham (1885-1952), Heiress; wife of 14th Earl of Winchilsea and Nottingham at the National Portrait Gallery, London

1885 births
1952 deaths
English countesses
Margaretta
20th-century English nobility